Poso Airport , also known as Poso-Kern County Airport, is a county-owned public-use airport located four nautical miles (7 km) east of the central business district of Famoso, in Kern County, California, United States. It is mostly used for general aviation.

Facilities and aircraft 
It has one runway designated 16/34 with an asphalt surface measuring 3,000 by 60 feet (914 x 18 m). For the 12-month period ending March 17, 2010, the airport had 1,000 general aviation aircraft operations, an average of 83 per month.

History

Built as the Poso Auxiliary Field or Poso Field Aux No. 6, this was a satellite training airfield of Minter Field named for the city of Poso, California that was renamed Famoso, California. Poso Auxiliary Field covered 400 acres and was used for training World War II pilots in landing and takeoff. The US Army built a 3,000 by 3,000 landing mat airstrip in 1942. The Vultee BT-13 Valiant and Boeing-Stearman Model 75 were the most common planes used for training at Poso Auxiliary Field and the Minter Army Airfields.

Poso Auxiliary Field was closed on October 8, 1946.

In 1950 the west side of the runway became the Famoso Raceway, a dragstrip. The east side became Poso Airport.

See also
 List of airports in Kern County, California
Minter Army Airfield auxiliary fields
California during World War II
American Theater (1939–1945)
Military history of the United States during World War II
United States home front during World War II

References

External links 
 Aerial image as of 4 September 1994 from USGS The National Map

Airports in Kern County, California